Patricia Viterbo (21 March 1939 – 10 November 1966) was a French film actress.

Filmography

References

Bibliography
 Thomas Weisser. Spaghetti Westerns: The Good, the Bad, and the Violent. McFarland, 1992.

External links

1939 births
1966 deaths
French film actresses
20th-century French women